Veronica Holmsten (born 15 March 1956) is a Swedish luger. She competed in the women's singles event at the 1976 Winter Olympics.

References

1956 births
Living people
Swedish female lugers
Olympic lugers of Sweden
Lugers at the 1976 Winter Olympics
Sportspeople from Stockholm